OX is the fourth and final studio album by American metalcore band Coalesce, released on June 9, 2009 through Relapse Records. It is the band's only studio album released since 1999's 0:12 Revolution in Just Listening. OX became Coalesce's first charting release, peaking at number 28 on the US Top Heatseekers chart.

Track listing
All songs written by Coalesce.

Personnel
 Sean Ingram – vocals
 Jes Steineger – guitar
 Nathan Ellis – bass
 Nathan "Jr." Richardson – drums
 Produced, Engineered & Mixed by Ed Rose
 Mastered by Mike Fossenkemper

References

Coalesce (band) albums
2009 albums
Relapse Records albums
Albums produced by Ed Rose